Hank Smith (born January 18, 1946) is a Dutch former basketball player. He played as a  forward. He played in the Dutch Eredivisie for Flamingo's Haarlem (1972 to 1974), Canadians Amsterdam (1974 to 1983) and SV Argon (1998–99). Smith averaged 23.9 points per game in 297 Eredivisie games. He was named the Most Valuable Player (MVP) of the league in 1975–76.

References 

Living people
Canadians basketball players
SV Argon players
1946 births
Flamingo's Haarlem players
Dutch men's basketball players